Siamaggiore ( or Siamajori) is a comune (municipality) in the Province of Oristano in the Italian region Sardinia, located about  northwest of Cagliari and about  northeast of Oristano.

Siamaggiore borders the following municipalities: Oristano, Solarussa, Tramatza, Zeddiani.

References

Cities and towns in Sardinia